Putao is the northernmost town of Kachin State, Myanmar. It is the principal town in Putao Township. It can only be reached by road during summer and winter as long as it doesn't rain in winter although the road area is tropical and rainfall also very common whole year, but is accessible year round by air if there are sufficient tourist groups to justify a plane. The area around Putao is famous for the variety of endemic birds and rare orchids, which grow naturally. Many orchid lovers are especially attracted by the so-called "Black Orchid" that can be found in the mountains east and west of Putao.  Hkakabo Razi and other snow-capped mountains are visible from Putao. Putao also attracts enthusiasts, hiking to Hkakabo Razi base camp, located close to Tahaundam.

History

Hkamti Long

Hkamti Long (also known as Khamti Long) is the former name of one of the outlying Shan States. It was a princely state around the city of Putao settled by the Khamti Shan people. The name means "Great Place of Gold" in the Khamti Shan language. Nowadays, there are Rawang and Lisu people, who are already regarded as Kachin nationalities. The seven-day-trek to West-Putao's mountain region, in which explorers found that there are Hta Lone (Hta Rone) ethnic whose height are lower than four feet. The population of this ethnic minority is so few nowadays that they are facing the threat of being extinct. The area covered by Hkamti Long may have included parts of what is now Kachin State (where Putao is located) as well as that of Shan State.

Geography
Geographically, Putao is just over 2000 feet above the sea levels and it is the central town for transportation in far-north towns and villages of Burma. Mount Hkakabo Razi and other snow-capped mountains are visible from Putao. Putao also attracts enthusiasts, hiking to Khakaborazi and other famous summits, located close to Tahaundam and borderline of Burma.

Transportation 
As Putao is a farland of central Burma, transportation is very hard and yearly rainfall makes it worse. Putao can be reached by road during summer and winter as long as it does not rain in winter although the road area is tropical and rainfall also very common whole year, but is accessible year round by air almost anytime (except sometimes) by airplane.

Tourist attractions 
The most attractive interest after mountains is the Nat-Island which is known as mini Niagara fall but without Fall. Main foreign-Tourist attractions are mountains, rare orchids, rare herbs, Burmese Cordyceps 
(ရှီးပတီး) while the famous Buddhist pagoda Kaungmhulon which is briefly known as the northern-most attracts local Buddhists. Putao is also famous for travelling to Sunlonchat mountain (a very few of the mountains to see snow without having to climb for weeks) which take nearly 20 hours drive.

Climate
The climate of Putao is a monsoon-influenced humid subtropical climate (Köppen Cwa) with very high amount of precipitation throughout the monsoon season. Average temperature in January is 13.1 °C, August is the hottest month with 25.9 °C.

See also
Putao Airport
Putao Tourism Information

References

External links
A Trip to Putao, Kachin State, Myanmar
Glossary of Burmese terms

Township capitals of Myanmar
Populated places in Kachin State